The 2020–21 Sydney Thunder Women's season is the sixth in the team's history. Coached by Trevor Griffin and captained by Rachael Haynes, the Thunder won the WBBL06 championship on 28 November 2020. Playing the entirety of the tournament in a bio-secure Sydney hub due to the COVID-19 pandemic, they finished the regular season in third place before defeating the double defending champions, the Brisbane Heat, to record an epic semi-final boilover.

In the final, held at North Sydney Oval, the Sydney Thunder defeated the Melbourne Stars by seven wickets with 38 balls remaining to win their second Women's Big Bash League title. Shabnim Ismail was awarded Player of the Match after taking key early wickets against the top-qualifying Stars team, leading to a "thumping" victory for the Thunder.

Squad 
Each 2020–21 squad is to be made up of 15 active players. Teams can sign up to five 'marquee players', with a maximum of three of those from overseas. Marquees are classed as any overseas player, or a local player who holds a Cricket Australia national contract at the start of the WBBL|06 signing period.

Personnel changes made ahead of the season included:

 Former Australian players Alex Blackwell and Rene Farrell retired from cricket at the end of WBBL05.
 New Zealand marquee Rachel Priest departed the Thunder, signing with the Hobart Hurricanes.
 Sammy-Jo Johnson signed a two-year contract with the Thunder, departing the Brisbane Heat.
 Lauren Smith signed with the Thunder, departing the Sydney Sixers.
 Lisa Griffith departed the Thunder, signing with the Sydney Sixers.
 England marquee Heather Knight signed with the Thunder, departing the Hobart Hurricanes.
 England marquee Tammy Beaumont signed with the Thunder, departing the Melbourne Renegades.

Changes made during the season included:
 Gabby Sutcliffe was signed from the reserve player pool. She played for the Sydney Thunder on 1 November, replacing Hannah Darlington (ankle/shin).

The table below lists the Thunder players and their key stats (including runs scored, batting strike rate, wickets taken, economy rate, catches and stumpings) for the season.

Ladder

Fixtures 
All times are local time

Regular season

Knockout phase

Tammy Beaumont launched the Thunder off to a fast start with 27 runs from 20 deliveries, though she was brought undone by a Nicola Hancock slower ball during the last over of the powerplay. Sydney struggled throughout the middle portion of the innings, especially troubled by Brisbane bowlers Nadine de Klerk and Amelia Kerr who collectively managed economical figures of 3/30 from seven overs. Instead of choosing to bowl the 20th over herself, Heat captain Jess Jonassen turned to the medium pace of Delissa Kimmince to close out the innings. Thunder captain Rachael Haynes ensured a respectable total for her team, finishing on 48 not out, as Sydney scored 15 from the final over and set Brisbane a target of 144 for victory.

Thunder spinner Samantha Bates struck early in the run chase, bowling Grace Harris for six, before being hit for three consecutive boundaries in the fourth over by Georgia Redmayne. Soon after playing-and-missing three times in a row to Shabnim Ismail, Redmayne was caught for 25 by Haynes at mid-on against the bowling of Sammy-Jo Johnson. Promoted up the batting order to number three, de Klerk formed a steady partnership with Jonassen, putting on 46 runs together in little more than six overs. When Jonassen was caught-and-bowled for 19 by Hannah Darlington, the Heat required a manageable task of 64 runs from 52 balls with seven wickets in hand. In the following over, de Klerk was run out by a direct hit from Beaumont for a run-a-ball 27. Facing her first delivery, Laura Kimmince survived an extremely close call, playing a flighted Bates delivery on to leg stump—the ball, however, did not connect with enough force to dislodge the bails. Kimmince quickly took advantage of her luck, manically compiling 37 runs from her next 15 balls. Although her aggressive strokeplay led to a plummeting required run rate, she was involved in two running-between-the-wickets mix-ups which led to the run outs of Georgia Voll and Amelia Kerr, keeping the door ajar for a miraculous Sydney comeback.

On the last delivery of the 17th over, with the Brisbane Heat needing just 16 runs to win, Laura Kimmince attempted a high-risk reverse slog against Samantha Bates, only to miss the ball which deflected off her thigh before crashing into the stumps—the bails, this time, were sent airborne. Taking the ball in the 18th over, Hannah Darlington struck twice in two balls to put the Heat in the precarious position of needing 14 runs with only one wicket in hand. Sammy-Jo Johnson completed the Thunder's remarkable resurrection on the third ball of the 19th over, removing Delissa Kimmince for a golden duck via caught-and-bowled, sealing a twelve-run victory and cementing Sydney's spot in Saturday's final. Brisbane's sudden "horror" collapse consisted of losing six wickets for twelve runs, ultimately ending their seven-match winning streak and quest for a three-peat. Media outlets described the match and its unlikely outcome as "chaotic," a "rollercoaster" and "one of the best comebacks in the WBBL's short history." Seven Network commentator Trent Copeland said "when Kimmince was flying you thought the game was gone," and Fox Cricket analyst Molly Strano commented "I don't think I've seen such massive swings in momentum in a game, ever."

From the first over of the match, the Stars top-order was dominated by a "fiery" spell from Thunder pace bowler Shabnim Ismail, who regularly beat the bat of Elyse Villani and created two catching opportunities against Meg Lanning before dismissing both players for scores of one and 13 respectively. After being dropped on zero by Tammy Beaumont at point, as well as surviving a half-chance which Sammy-Jo Johnson put down at third man, Lanning's seven-ball battle with Ismail came to an end when she edged a seaming delivery through to wicket-keeper Tahlia Wilson at the start of the seventh over. Thunder captain Rachael Haynes was praised for "sensing the moment" by taking the tactical risk of persisting with Ismail, leading to Lanning's wicket which several media outlets described as the defining moment of the match: writing for The Sydney Morning Herald, Tom Decent said "this was the Thunder's night about a quarter of an hour into the contest," while the Australian Associated Press suggested the "Stars' shot at a maiden title was realistically gone inside 37 balls."

Melbourne could not recover from their poor start to post a significant total, slumping further to 5/37 by the halfway mark of the first innings. Annabel Sutherland scored 20 from as many balls but, like Lanning, did not capitalise on two reprieves afforded to her by the Thunder's underwhelming performance in the field. Wickets continued to flow as every Sydney bowler picked up at least one each. Johnson, having opened the bowling with Ismail and proving similarly difficult to score against, finished with match-best figures of 2/11 off four overs which included claiming the wicket of Mignon du Preez via LBW during the powerplay. Katherine Brunt, ending the innings on 22 not out from 27 deliveries, ensured the Stars lasted the allotted 20 overs but their overall score of 9/86 was nevertheless the lowest-ever in a WBBL final.

In reply, Tammy Beaumont (16 off 15) and Rachel Trenaman (23 off 26) steadily opened the Thunder's innings, while experienced campaigners Heather Knight (26 not out) and Rachael Haynes (21 not out) completed the comfortable run chase through a flurry of boundaries. With a lofted drive over long-off that sailed for six, Knight hit the winning runs off the bowling of Alana King in the 14th over, clinching a seven-wicket victory with 38 balls remaining. The Sydney Thunder consequently claimed their second WBBL championship, having also won the inaugural title—only Haynes and Samantha Bates were members of both successful squads, the latter missing the WBBL|01 final due to a broken wrist injury sustained earlier in the tournament. The triumph also marked an individual three-peat for Sammy-Jo Johnson, who won the WBBL04 and WBBL05 titles with the Brisbane Heat before moving to the Thunder. Lauren Smith—making her fifth appearance in a WBBL final—earned a third Women's Big Bash League championship as well, having won the WBBL02 and WBBL03 titles with the Sydney Sixers.

A major talking point of the match surrounded the decision made at the toss, where Stars captain Meg Lanning sent her own team in to bat first—a noticeable departure from the tactics she employed throughout the season. In fact, it was the first time a Lanning-led WBBL team would opt against chasing since the 2016–17 season. Explaining the shock choice, Lanning said: "We just thought our batting line-up was in really good form, and we thought we'd back ourselves in to get a decent score." Stars coach Trent Woodhill implied the decision was swayed by the Brisbane Heat's collapse under pressure two days earlier: "We also saw what happened with the Heat and the Thunder (semi-final) the other night." The following day, Woodhill added: "It was a sliding door moment. There's no regrets. It was a team decision."

Statistics and awards 
 Most runs: Heather Knight – 446 (4th in the league)
Highest score in an innings: Heather Knight – 83 (39) vs Adelaide Strikers, 31 October
Most wickets: Sammy-Jo Johnson – 22 (1st in the league)
Best bowling figures in an innings: Sammy-Jo Johnson – 4/26 (4 overs) vs Melbourne Renegades, 7 November
Most catches: Phoebe Litchfield – 13 (1st in the league)
Player of the Match awards:
Heather Knight – 3
Shabnim Ismail, Sammy-Jo Johnson – 2 each
Samantha Bates, Hannah Darlington, Rachael Haynes – 1 each
WBBL06 Player of the Tournament: Heather Knight (3rd)
WBBL06 Team of the Tournament: Samantha Bates, Hannah Darlington, Heather Knight
WBBL06 Young Gun: Rachel Trenaman (week 2 nominee), Phoebe Litchfield (week 5 nominee)
 Alex Blackwell Medal: Heather Knight

Notes

References 

2020–21 Women's Big Bash League season by team
Sydney Thunder (WBBL)